is a passenger railway station in the city of Kashiwa, Chiba, Japan, operated by the private railway operator Tōbu Railway. The station is numbered "TD-27".

Lines

Station layout
The station consists of two opposed side platforms serving two tracks, with an elevated station house.

Platforms

History
Sakasai Station was opened in 29 July 1933 as a signal stop on the Sobu Railways. It was elevated to a full station in 1949. The current station building was completed in 1985. From 17 March 2012, station numbering was introduced on all Tobu lines, with Sakasai Station becoming "TD-27".

Passenger statistics
In fiscal 2019, the station was used by an average of 14,131 passengers daily.

Surrounding area
Sakasai Post Office

References

External links

 Tōbu Railway Station information 

Railway stations in Japan opened in 1933
Railway stations in Chiba Prefecture
Tobu Noda Line
Stations of Tobu Railway
Kashiwa